The Limington Historic District encompasses the historic village center of the rural community of Limington, Maine.  Centered at the junction of Maine State Routes 11 and 117, the district includes 24 buildings erected between the late 18th and mid-19th centuries.  The district was listed on the National Register of Historic Places in 1999.

Description and history
The town of Limington, located in northern York County, was settled in the 1770s, and its center former at the junction of four large properties owner by early proprietor.  Thaddeus Richardson owned the northeast quadrant, and gave land for the Congregational church (whose current Greek Revival building dates to 1835), and that to the northwest by Philemon Libby, whose c. 1794 house still stands.  At the southeast corner was the property of Ephraim Clark, who gave land for the town's animal pound, roughly where the 1871 town hall now stands.  The southwest property was owned by the Chick family, and is where the library stands, a 1912 design by John Calvin Stevens and his son John Howard Stevens.

Most of the remaining buildings in the district are residential.  These are typically wood frame buildings, 1-1/2 or 2-1/2 stories in height, with Federal or Greek Revival styling.  A notable exception is the c. 1860 Moody House, which has Italianate brackets.  Two buildings were originally used to house retail stores, but have long since been converted to residential use.  Non-residential structures include the 1818 Masonic hall, built on the site of a store operated by Philemon Libby, and the c. 1864 Grange hall, which was originally built to house a small clothing factory.

See also
National Register of Historic Places listings in York County, Maine

References

Federal architecture in Maine
Gothic Revival architecture in Maine
Buildings and structures completed in 1790
Historic districts in York County, Maine
Historic districts on the National Register of Historic Places in Maine
National Register of Historic Places in York County, Maine
Limington, Maine